Charles Martin-Sauvaigo (7 February 1881 – 9 November 1970) was a French painter. His work was part of the painting event in the art competition at the 1928 Summer Olympics.

References

1881 births
1970 deaths
20th-century French painters
20th-century French male artists
French male painters
Olympic competitors in art competitions
People from Nice